The Eastern Himalayan alpine shrub and meadows is a montane grasslands and shrublands ecoregion of Bhutan, China, India, Myanmar, and Nepal, which lies between the tree line and snow line in the eastern portion of the Himalaya Range.

Setting

The alpine shrub and meadows lie between approximately  elevation. Permanent ice and snow lies above . The Eastern Himalayan subalpine conifer forests lie below  along the southern slopes of the range, from Central Nepal to Bhutan. The Northeastern Himalayan subalpine conifer forests lie south of the range in Arunachal Pradesh, extending north of the range into the lower valley of the Brahmaputra River and its tributaries. The Northern Triangle temperate forests lie to the south of the alpine shrub and meadows in northern Myanmar, and the Nujiang Lancang Gorge alpine conifer and mixed forests lie to the east in the gorges of the upper Irrawaddy and Salween rivers.

The Yarlung Tsangpo arid steppe lies in the upper Brahmaputra Valley of Tibet, north of the Eastern Himalayan alpine shrub and meadows.

Flora
Alpine shrublands, characterized by rhododendrons, predominate at lower elevations, close to the treeline. The rhododendron flora of the ecoregion is quite varied, with species composition changing as one moves from west to east along the range.

Above the shrublands are alpine meadows which support a variety of herbaceous plants, including species of Alchemilla, Androsace, Anemone, Diapensia, Draba, Gentiana, Impatiens, Leontopodium, Meconopsis, Pedicularis, Potentilla, Primula, Rhododendron, Saussurea, Saxifraga, Sedum, and Viola. In the spring and summer, the alpine meadows are covered with brightly colored flowers.

On the upper slopes, low grasses and cushion plants grow among the boulders and scree.

Fauna
Large mammals include the snow leopard (Uncia uncia), bharal or Himalayan blue sheep (Pseudois nayaur), Himalayan tahr (Hemitragus jemlahicus), takin (Budorcas taxicolor), Himalayan musk deer (Moschus chrysogaster), Himalayan goral (Nemorhaedus baileyi), and Himalayan serow (Capricornis thar). Smaller mammals include Himalayan marmots (Marmota himalayana), weasels, and pikas.

Conservation
Several protected areas lie within or partly within the ecoregion, including:

 Valley of Flowers National Park, India
 Annapurna Conservation Area, Nepal
 Bumdeling Wildlife Sanctuary, Bhutan
 Dihang-Dibang Biosphere Reserve, India
 Dongjiu Nature Reserve, China
 Jigme Singye Wangchuck National Park, Bhutan
 Jigme Dorji National Park, Bhutan
 Langtang National Park, Nepal
 Makalu-Barun National Park and Conservation Area, Nepal
 Motuo Nature Reserve, China
 Sakteng Wildlife Sanctuary, Bhutan
 Sagarmatha National Park, Nepal
 Thrumshingla National Park, Bhutan
 Torsa Strict Nature Reserve, Bhutan
 Walong National Park, India
 Nanda Devi National Park, India

See also
List of ecoregions in India

References

External links 
 
 WWF: Map of ecoregions in Nepal and China, showing the Eastern Himalayan alpine shrub and meadows
 

Ecoregions of Asia
Ecoregions of Bhutan
Ecoregions of China
Ecoregions of the Himalayas
Ecoregions of India
Ecoregions of Myanmar
Ecoregions of Nepal
Montane grasslands and shrublands
Palearctic ecoregions